= Autovía A-309 =

Highway in Andalusia, Spain

The Autovía A-309 is a highway in Spain. It passes through Andalusia.
